Sandu Ciorăscu (born September 11, 1966) in Bârlad, is a former Romanian rugby union football player. He played as a lock.

Club career
Sandu played for Baia Mare and also for Auch during his career and also captained the French side.

International career
Ciorăscu gathered 41 caps for Romania, from his debut in 1988 to his last game in 1999. He scored 2 tries during his international career, 8 points on aggregate. He was a member of his national side for the 2nd and 3rd Rugby World Cups in 1991 and 1995 and played in each of the 3 group matches.

External links
Sandu Ciorăscu International Statistics at ESPN
Sandu Ciorăscu's Profile at It'srugby
Les crocs roumains de Sandu Ciorascu, ladepeche.fr

References

1966 births
Living people
Romanian rugby union players
Romania international rugby union players
CSM Știința Baia Mare players
Rugby union locks
Sportspeople from Bârlad